SS Harvey Cushing was a Liberty ship built in the United States during World War II. She was named after Harvey Cushing, an American neurosurgeon, pathologist, writer and draftsman. A pioneer of brain surgery, he was the first exclusive neurosurgeon and the first person to describe Cushing's disease.

Construction
Harvey Cushing was laid down on 5 September 1943, under a Maritime Commission (MARCOM) contract, MC hull 1210, by the St. Johns River Shipbuilding Company, Jacksonville, Florida; she was sponsored by Betsey Cushing Roosevelt Whitney, the daughter of the namesake, and was launched on 31 October 1943.

History
She was allocated to Marine Transport Lines, Inc., on 11 November 1943. On 30 August 1946, she was laid up in the National Defense Reserve Fleet, Mobile, Alabama. She was sold for commercial use, 9 December 1946, to the government of Italy, for $544,506. She was removed from the fleet on 25 February 1947. Harvey Cushing was renamed Eretteo and reflagged in Italy. On 20 September 1965, she ran aground on Sakhalin Island, and broke in two. She was refloated by the Soviet Union and towed to Sovetskaya Gavan, where she was most likely scrapped.

References

Bibliography

 
 
 
 

 

Liberty ships
Ships built in Jacksonville, Florida
1943 ships
Mobile Reserve Fleet
Liberty ships transferred to Italy